Jalal al-Din is a male Muslim given name of Arabic origin, formed from the name Jalal with the suffix al-Din. It may also be written as Jalal ad-Din, Jalaluddin, Jalaleddin, Dželaludin and Djelaludin.

Notable people with the title or name include:

People
Jalaluddin Hasan (Jalālu-d-Dīn Ḥassan III, 1187–1221), 25th Nizāri Ismā‘ilī Imām
Jalal ad-Din Mingburnu (died 1231), last ruler of the Khwarezmid Empire
Jalal al-Din Muhammad or Rumi (1207–1273), Persian poet and Sufi mystic
Jalaluddin Tabrizi (died 1288), Sufi saint of Bengal
Jalaluddin Surkh-Posh Bukhari (c. 1192–1291), Suhrawardiyya Sufi saint
Jalal ud din Firuz Khalji (died 1296), first Indian ruler of the Delhi sultanate and founder of the Khalji dynasty
Jalal al-Din Mahmud (died 1352), Mihrabanid king of Sistan
Jalal ad-Din khan (1380–1412), khan of Golden Horde, son of Tokhtamysh, leader of Lipka Tatars
Jalaluddin Muhammad Shah (died 1433), ruler of Bengal
Jalaluddin Fateh Shah (died 1487), ruler of Bengal
Jalaladdin Davani (1426–1502), Persian philosopher, theologian, jurist and poet
Imam Jalaluddin Al-Suyuti (c. 1445–1505), Egyptian religious scholar, juristic expert and teacher.
Jalal ad-Din Al-Mahalli, co-author of Tafsir al-Jalalayn.
Jalaluddin Muhammad Akbar (1542–1605), Mugal Emperor of India
Jalal Al-Din Mirza (1827–1872), Persian historian and freethinker
Jalal al-Din Muhammad al-Isfahani, (fl. 1828), Persian physician
Jalaluddin Mirza (1864–1876), prince of the Mughal royal family
Muhammad Jalaluddin Sayeed (born 1920), founding director of Neptune Orient Lines
Jalal Al-Din Taheri (1926–2013), Iranian Islamic theologian
Jalaluddin Umri (born 1935), Indian Muslim writer
Jalal Mansur Nuriddin (Jalaluddin Mansur Nuriddin, born 1944), American musician and hip hop pioneer
Mir Jalaleddin Kazzazi (born 1949), Iranian writer
Jalaluddin Haqqani (born c. 1950), Afghan military leader
Jalaluddin Hassan (born 1954), Malaysian actor
Jalal al-Din Ali al-Saghir (born 1957), Iraqi politician
Jalal-ud-Din (cricketer) (born 1959), Pakistani cricketer
Dželaludin Muharemović (born 1970), Bosnian footballer
Djelaludin Sharityar (born 1983), Afghan-German footballer
Jalaledin Alimohammadi (born 1990), Iranian footballer
Jalaleddin Farsi, Iranian politician
Jalaluddin (Jalaluddin Slava) Slava, American
Jasurbek Jaloliddinov (born 2002), Uzbek footballer

Other
Jalaleddin (novella), Armenian historical novel by Raffi

Arabic masculine given names